Young Heart Full of Love is a 1953 West German family drama film directed by Paul May and starring Heinrich Gretler, Hans Brenner and Lore Frisch. Much of the film was shot on location in and around Obergurgl and the Ötztal Alps in the Austrian Tyrol.

Synopsis
After losing his parents in an avalanche, a boy becomes devoted to the animals on his farm.

Cast
 Heinrich Gretler as Großvater Moosleitner
 Hans Brenner as Hansi Moosleitner 'Haflingersepp'
 Lore Frisch as Mariele Moosleitner
 Bernhard Wicki as Vitus Zingerl
 Armin Dahlen as Junglehrer Gstreiner
 Rudolf Carl as Altlehrer Sagschnöller
 Paul Hörbiger as Landesstallmeister
 Hermann Kowan as Rauthaler
 Wolf Ackva as Tonio Rossi
 Werner Lieven as Italienischer Wirt
 Leni Gehrig as Sängerin
 Kurt E. Ludwig as Peppo
 Uli Steigberg as Cesare

References

Bibliography 
 John Holmstrom. The Moving Picture Boy: An International Encyclopaedia from 1895 to 1995. Michael Russell, 1996.

External links 
 

1953 films
1953 drama films
German drama films
West German films
1950s German-language films
Films directed by Paul May
German black-and-white films
1950s German films
Films shot in Austria
Films set in the Alps